Sidney Street may refer to:

The Siege of Sidney Street, a notorious gunfight in London's East End in 1911
Sidney Street, Cambridge, England
Sidney Street (politician), retired aerospace engineer who was the 2006 Republican candidate in the 38th Congressional District